Babalu Mahalleh (also Romanized as Bābālū Maḩalleh; also known as Bābālū and Bābālū Maḩalleh-ye Ḩavīq) is a village in Haviq Rural District, Haviq District, Talesh County, Gilan Province, Iran. At the 2006 census, its population was 463, in 80 families.

Language 
Linguistic composition of the village.

References 

Populated places in Talesh County

Azerbaijani settlements in Gilan Province